Mercer (formerly, Mercersville) is an unincorporated community in southwestern Edgecombe County, North Carolina, United States. Dr. A. B. Nobles House and McKendree Church was listed on the National Register of Historic Places in 1982.

References

Unincorporated communities in Edgecombe County, North Carolina
Unincorporated communities in North Carolina